Written and illustrated by Naoki Urasawa, Monster was published in Big Comic Original from December 1994 to December 2001. The 162 chapters were periodically collected into 18 tankōbon volumes published by Shōgakukan, the first on 30 June 1995 and the last on 28 February 2002. While writing Monster, Urasawa began the series 20th Century Boys in 1999, which would continue after Monster had finished.

Monster was licensed in North America by Viz Media, who published all 18 volumes between 21 February 2006 and 16 December 2008. Starting in July 2014, they published a re-release of the series in nine two-in-one volumes, titled Monster: The Perfect Edition, with a new volume published every three months. The series has also received domestic releases in other countries, such as in Germany by Egmont Manga & Anime, in France and the Netherlands by Kana, in Spain by Planeta DeAgostini, in Brazil by Conrad Editora and later by Panini Comics, in Argentina by Larp Editores, in Taiwan by Tong Li Publishing, in Mexico by Grupo Editorial Vid, and in Poland by Hanami.

Volume list

Another Monster

References

External links
 
 

Monster